Penn State New Kensington is a commonwealth campus of the Pennsylvania State University located in New Kensington, Pennsylvania. The campus has an enrollment of 545 undergraduate students and offers twelve bachelor's degree programs and five associate degree programs as well as four men's and four women's sports.

History 
The New Kensington campus was founded in 1958 as a result of a study of the local need for higher education in the Alle-Kiski Valley. The first class graduated in 1960 at the New Kensington Center in the city of New Kensington. The Center moved to the old Parnassus School in 1963. The current campus opened with the Engineering Building in 1966 on  donated by ALCOA. Two years later the Science, Activities, and Administration buildings and the Library were completed and an additional  were purchased from a neighboring farmer. In 1969 the Physical Education Complex opened followed by the Theatre in 1971 and the Student Learning Center in 1975. The Science and Technology Center opened in 1990. After a ten-year building hiatus, the Conference Center and Classroom Building was dedicated in March 2001.

Campus

Financial aid and scholarships 
70 percent of students receive aid (loans, scholarships, grants, work-study);
Thirty-five campus scholarships awarded to 140 students.

Student life 
Penn State New Kensington has 20 student organizations that are academic, social, and professional in nature.  The Campus Activities Board (CAB) and Student Life Office host a large range of events and activities for students that supplement their academic experience on campus.  Most activities hosted by CAB and Student Life are free of charge or come at reduced costs to the students participating.  One of the signature programs of student life at Penn State New Kensington is the Penn State in Pittsburgh program, which introduces students to the cultural, athletic, and recreational activities of the Pittsburgh region.

Athletics 
Penn State–New Kensington teams participate as a member of the United States Collegiate Athletic Association (USCAA). The Nittany Lions are also a member of the Pennsylvania State University Athletic Conference (PSUAC).

Penn State New Kensington hosts the following athletic teams:

Facilities 
Ten buildings on seventy-two wooded acres that includes a multi-purpose Conference Center,  the 350-seat Forum Theatre, 600-seat Athletics Center; Art Gallery.
 Blissell Library: Over 40,000 books, 200 journal and newspaper subscriptions, and a small video collection. Electronic access to nearly four million volumes in Penn State's Libraries system.
 Information Technology Center: Dedicated in June 2000, the $3 million IT Center is equipped with state-of-the-art software and computer technology. The Center contains the 35-seat Allegheny Ludlum Technology Classroom; two additional multi-media classrooms, a video conferencing room, a laboratory for network simulation and pc troubleshooting, and a smaller learning studio. The IT Center contains high-end Pentium 4 workstations and it is located in the Activities Building.
 Ten Specialized Laboratories: Electro-Mechanical Engineering Technology Measurement & Instrumentation Laboratory; Electro-Mechanical Engineering Technology Control Systems Laboratory; Mechanical Engineering Laboratory; Robotics Laboratory which includes separate stations and milling stations; Electrical Engineering Technology Lab; Power Laboratory; Computer Aided Drafting and Design Laboratory; Drafting Classroom; Biomedical Engineering Technology Laboratory (one of only three in the country); Biomedical Engineering Technology Operating Laboratory.
 Computer Center: Large student laboratory, two teaching laboratories and a faculty laboratory; five-to-one student to computer ratio is one of the lowest ratios in the university; students receive e-mail and Internet account.

See also
Pennsylvania State University Commonwealth campuses

External links
Official website
Penn State New Kensington Athletics website

Pennsylvania State University colleges
Educational institutions established in 1958
Universities and colleges in Westmoreland County, Pennsylvania
1958 establishments in Pennsylvania
USCAA member institutions
New Kensington